Displayed below are the doubles results from the 2008 ITF Kolkata Open Women's Tennis Tournament.
Alla Kudryavtseva and Vania King were the defending champions, but they chose not to participate that year.
Laura Siegemund and Ágnes Szatmári won the title, defeating Lu Jingjing and Sun Shengnan in the final, 7–5, 6–3.

Seeds

  Lu Jingjing /  Sun Shengnan (final)
  Chan Chin-wei /  Chen Yi (semifinals)
  Laura Siegemund /  Ágnes Szatmári (champions)
  Chang Kai-chen /  Hwang I-hsuan (quarterfinals)

Draw

Draw

References

External links
 Draw

2008 Women's Doubles
Kolkata Open - Women's Doubles
Itf Kolkata Open - Women's Doubles